The Jianshanying Formation is a geological formation located in Ninglang County, Yunnan Province. It has been dated to the Late Carboniferous period.

References

Geologic formations of China
Carboniferous China
Pennsylvanian Series
Geology of Yunnan